The 2017 season is Kristiansund's first season in Eliteserien.

Squad

Transfers

Winter

In:

Out:

Summer

In:

Out:

Competitions

Eliteserien

Results summary

Results by round

Results

Table

Norwegian Cup

Squad statistics

Appearances and goals

|-
|colspan="14"|Players away from Kristiansund on loan:
|-
|colspan="14"|Players who left Kristiansund during the season:

|}

Goal scorers

Disciplinary record

References

Kristiansund
Kristiansund BK seasons